The governor of Kyoto, officially Governor of Kyoto Prefecture, is the chief executive of Kyoto, a prefecture in Japan. It serves from 1868 and comes from Kyoto machi-bugyō. The governors were appointed by the Home Ministry until 1947. The current governor is Takatoshi Nishiwaki, who was inaugurated on April 16, 2018.

Appointed governors, 1868–1947

Elected governors, 1947–present

References

Politics of Kyoto Prefecture

Kyoto Prefecture
Kyoto Prefecture